All Ladies Do It is a 1992 Italian sex comedy film directed by Tinto Brass and starring Claudia Koll. It is loosely based on Mozart/da Ponte opera Così fan tutte.

Synopsis
Diana (Claudia Koll) is a Roman wife happily married to sympathetic Paolo (Paolo Lanza) but she is keen on playing benign games of seduction with other men while resisting the advances of chic lingerie shop owner Silvio (Renzo Rinaldi) and she narrates her adventures to Paolo in order to stimulate their otherwise monotonous sexual life. However, under the influence of her lesbian friend Antonietta (Isabella Deiana) and raunchy sister Nadia (Ornella Marcucci), Diana starts to move the ongoings further while Paolo is still prone to believing that events narrated by her are merely fantasies. Nevertheless, when the French Sadean antiques dealer Donatien Alphonse (Franco Branciaroli) leaves marks on her body, Paolo understands that Diana is cheating on him and throws her out of the house. Diana then seeks further sexual adventures, while she and Paolo reflect on the nature of sexuality and monogamy, and their future as a couple.

Reception
In a retrospective review, Sight & Sound reviewed both The Key (1983) and All Ladies Do It, noting that the latter "shows a marked decline in narrative sophistication and wit" noting that the Venice setting in this film is set more in studio-based constructs than The Key. Brass' film relocates the story to Mussolini's time and changes the setting to Venice.

Indian adaptation
In November 2020, the Indian adaptation starring Sejal Shah released on Nuefliks OTT platform. The film  is directed by Akhil Gautam;

References

External links
 

1992 films
Adultery in films
Films directed by Tinto Brass
Commedia sexy all'italiana
1990s sex comedy films
Films set in Rome
Films scored by Pino Donaggio
Films based on Così fan tutte
1992 comedy films
1990s Italian films